Kweku Essien  (born 12 December 1984 in Kumasi) is a Ghanaian football player who is currently playing for Eleven Wise of the Globacom Premier League. Essien is variable in the midfield, he can play as attacking or defensive midfielder.

Career 
Essien began his professional career in 2003 at Asante Kotoko but left the club in 2005 and moved to F.C. Maamobi.  The central midfielder had a very good season at F.C. Maamobi in the 2005–06 Ghana Premier League season but was loaned out to Accra Hearts of Oak SC for $60,000 until June 2007. He was outstanding for King Faisal in their Premier League campaign, picking up 10 Most Valuable Player awards in the season. In 2007, he failed another trial, this time with Austrian side Sturm Graz. So far the MVP of Ghana football league for 2006–07 has failed to impress at Hertha BSC, Eintracht Frankfurt, TSG 1899 Hoffenheim, SCR Altach and now Sturm Graz. In July the same year, he was loaned out to German second division team VfL Osnabrück, but after six months in Germany he returned to F.C. Maamobi. In August 2008, was sold to F.C. Ashdod in Israel. After eight months in Israel he returned on 12 April 2009 to Ghana and signed with Eleven Wise.

International 
In 2006,Essien
was capped two times for the Black Stars.

Honours 
 2007 Most Valuable Player Glo Premier League

References

1984 births
Living people
Ghanaian footballers
Ghana international footballers
Association football defenders
Ghanaian expatriate sportspeople in Germany
VfL Osnabrück players
Expatriate footballers in Germany
Sekondi Wise Fighters players
Expatriate footballers in Israel
F.C. Ashdod players
King Faisal Babes FC players
Ghanaian expatriate sportspeople in Israel
2. Bundesliga players
Israeli Premier League players
Footballers from Kumasi